Compare++ is an auxiliary tool for programmers and Web developers. The tool can syntax-aware compare text files and folders quickly and do a 3-way merge. It is useful to detect differences in codes and match. In the review of Softsea in the June 2, 2010, Compare++ was awarded a 5-star rating. Compare++ runs on Microsoft Windows and is compatible with Windows 7.

On May 31, 2010, Compare++ got an Editor's Pick by Brothersoft. The editor described that "Compare++ structured compares and merges code, files and folders, and can detect function changes" and "highlights differences in a side-by-side interface".

Sinix, writing for Russian Software Developer Network (RSDN) on May 15, 2010, commented on the beta version of Compare++ and said "Compare++ (beta, but the potential is good)", and "Compare++ already knows how to detect and align methods, but only for C++ files. They promise to support other languages". In version 2, it can do syntax-aware comparison not only for C/C++ but also for Java, C#, Javascript, and CSS.

Features
According to the description on pcmag.com, Compare++ includes following features:
 Do data comparison, source code structured comparison, smart code diff and directory synchronization;
 Ignore comment, newline, pure format changes;
 Compare similar functions even from different files;
 Aligns and compares sub-sections of files such as C++ functions, classes;
 In-place editing and comparing of files;
 Compare or open the containing folder for loaded files;
 Integrates with other products such as revision control system;
 Command line interface;

See also 
Comparison of file comparison tools

References 
Warning: According to Norton, BrotherSoft is rated red. Use it with extreme caution.

External links 
 

File comparison tools